Lake Warden may refer to:

Lake Warden (Western Australia)
Warden Lake, West Virginia, USA